Dániel Kovács may refer to:
Dániel Kovács (footballer born June 1990), Hungarian footballer playing for Újpest FC from 2009
Dániel Kovács (footballer born July 1990), Hungarian footballer playing for Vasas SC from 2011